Carbonic anhydrase-related protein 11 is a protein that in humans is encoded by the CA11 gene.

Function 

Carbonic anhydrases (CAs) are a large family of zinc metalloenzymes that catalyze the reversible hydration of carbon dioxide.  They participate in a variety of biological processes, including respiration, calcification, acid-base balance, bone resorption, and the formation of aqueous humor, cerebrospinal fluid, saliva, and gastric acid.  They show extensive diversity in tissue distribution and in their subcellular localization.  CA XI is likely a secreted protein, however, radical changes at active site residues completely conserved in CA isozymes with catalytic activity, make it unlikely that it has carbonic anhydrase activity. It shares properties in common with two other acatalytic CA isoforms, CA VIII and CA X.  CA XI is most abundantly expressed in brain, and may play a general role in the central nervous system.

Interactions 

CA11 has been shown to interact with RIPK1.

References

External links

Further reading